Sonshine Media Network International (SMNI), also known by its legal operating name Swara Sug Media Corporation (SSMC), is a Filipino broadcast media arm of the Kingdom of Jesus Christ (KJC) led by the Filipino televangelist Pastor Apollo C. Quiboloy. Based in Davao City and Makati, it operates a network of radio and television broadcasting stations.

It currently owns and operates a sister channel (SMNI News Channel), the broadcasting network is available over terrestrial broadcast in the Philippines, and on cable, satellite, and online streaming worldwide. The network now owns and operates two television networks, where the main flagship station, based in Davao City, maintains an uninterrupted 24-hour service through regular repetition of a dozen self-produced Kingdom Programs in English, Filipino, and dozens of foreign languages along with news, public affairs, public service, infotainment, sports and entertainment programs. On the other hand, the network's sister channel SMNI News Channel, based in Makati, primarily provides rolling news coverage and public affairs programs, which broadcasts exclusively in Digital TV format in Metro Manila, Metro Davao, Benguet and Cagayan de Oro. It also maintains a network of radio stations under the "Sonshine Radio" brand of the Swara Sug Media Corporation.

The broadcasting network was licensed in late 2003 by the Philippine government to operate seven analog free-to-air television channels in key cities across the country. It also has four digital terrestrial channels in Metro Manila, Benguet, Cagayan de Oro and Metro Davao.

History
The Kingdom of Jesus Christ's Media Ministry, known today as SMNI, traced its roots on the radio, with the program "Pagsusi sa Kamatuoran" (Searching for Truth/Paghahanap ng Katotohanan) on radio stations DXDC and DXUM. The television ministry began in 1991, when they launched their first television program, "The Hour of Truth" aired nationally on IBC and ABS-CBN stations in Visayas and Mindanao, followed by "Powerline" in 1995.

In July 2000, The Kingdom of Jesus Christ officially launched its 24-hour cable network, "The Q Channel" (then also known as "ACQ–TV, Q Channel"), bringing the Gospel of the Kingdom from Davao City to key cities around the Philippines, which was carried by Sky Cable in Davao City, General Santos, Bacolod, Iloilo, Cebu, Tagum and Baguio.

On April 25, 2003, The Q Channel successfully metamorphosed as the "ACQ–Kingdom Broadcasting Network (ACQ-KBN)", with an expanded reach across the Asia-Pacific region and the United States via satellite, also carrying the new slogan "Delivering the Good news 24 hours a day, 7 days a week". During also in the same year, ACQ-KBN launched its first TV station Sonshine TV-43 Davao, and introduced new religious programs such as Give Us This Day, Sounds of Worship, Batang Kaharian (lit. Kingdom Child), Way Ahead, Highest Praise, Quiet Moments and many more.

In 2004, ACQ-KBN signed a historic agreement with GlobeCast World TV, which aims to expand its broadcast footprint around the world. In the same year also that KJC through ACQ-KBN launched its own radio station in Davao City as "DXAQ Kingdom Radio 1404 AM".

In March 2005, KJC and ACQ-KBN acquired the congressional franchise, ownership and management of the Swara Sug Media Corporation (SSMC). at the same day, ACQ-KBN and SSMC acquired all the NBC Angel Radyo AM stations from Nation Broadcasting Corporation, which in turn, gave birth as the "Sonshine Radio" network.

In November 6, 2005, DWAQ-TV Channel 39 signed on the air and began its test broadcast as "ACQ-KBN Sonshine TV-39 Metro Manila". On January 8, 2006, ACQ-KBN Sonshine TV 39 was launched during the first Global Thanksgiving and Worship presentation of the Kingdom of Jesus Christ, which held at the PhilSports Arena, the network ventured from Cable TV broadcasting to Free-to-Air TV broadcasting, and broadcasts with the transmitter power of 60 kilowatts.

On June 5, 2006, ACQ-KBN Sonshine TV launched "Sonshine Media Network International (SMNI)" as News and Public Affairs block which became a tie-up of ACQ-KBN Sonshine TV-39 in Metro Manila and ACQ-KBN Sonshine TV-43 in Davao, with the original slogan "Service First, Right Here, Right Now, Worldwide".

On July 30, 2006, ACQ-KBN Sonshine TV is now on Nationwide with more than 500 cable TV operators across the Philippines.

On January 4, 2009, ACQ-KBN Sonshine TV-37 in Santiago, Isabela officially signed on as the network's third TV station during the first Global Thanksgiving and Worship presentation at the Buenavista Barangay Hall in Santiago, Isabela. A few months later on May 10, 2009, The ACQ-KBN Sonshine TV-39 Butuan was also launched after the first global thanksgiving and Worship presentation at the Luciana Convention Center in Butuan.

In August 2010, ACQ-KBN Sonshine TV (merger of ACQ-KBN and Sonshine Media Network International) was renamed again as simply "SMNI", the network now focuses in Religious, News and Public Affairs programs carried from the now-defunct ACQ-KBN, it also the network was launched with the new slogan "Alternative media, Alternative power, it Sustains Life" (first slogan) and "Informs, Delivers, Transforms" (second slogan) with a new station ID.

In January 2011, SMNI was launched with a new slogan "Where Everything is Possible" with a new station ID.

On May 24, 2016, SMNI launched its own News and Public affairs channel as SMNI News Channel and it is exclusively aired over Digital Terrestrial Television on UHF Channel 40 in Metro Manila until December 31, 2022 (move to UHF Channel 43 starting January 1, 2023) and its internet Live streaming.

On August 31, 2019, Philippine President Rodrigo Duterte signed Republic Act No. 11422 which renewed Swara Sug Media Corporation license for another 25 years. The law grants SSMC a franchise to construct, install, operate, and maintain, for commercial purposes, radio broadcasting stations and television stations, including digital television system, with the corresponding facilities such as relay stations, throughout the Philippines.

On January 26, 2022, the National Telecommunications Commission assigned the network's television frequency on channel 43 which was formerly used by Mareco Broadcasting Network as a TV carry-over station of 105.1 Crossover from 1994 to 2000 and AMCARA Broadcasting Network for ABS-CBN's DTT broadcast on ABS-CBN TV Plus from 2013 to 2020. On January 1, 2023, SMNI began to transmit its digital test broadcast on UHF Channel 43 (647.143 MHz) as its permanent frequency assigned by NTC.

On February 19, 2023, SMNI DTT Channel 43 officially signed on during the first Global Thanksgiving and Worship presentation at the Ynares Center in Antipolo, Rizal. the network covered in Metro Manila and nearby provinces. Channel 43 will be used as the main channel of SMNI on DTT, while retaining the use of Channel 39 as a secondary channel after transitioning from analog to digital signal.

SMNI TV programs

SMNI stations nationwide

SMNI TV stations in the Philippines

SMNI TV nationwide

SMNI TV on digital terrestrial television

Affiliates

SMNI TV on pay television

*And 500 Cable TV Operators in the Philippines.

Sonshine radio stations

Criticism and alleged bias

Media institutions and sectoral rights groups have accused SMNI of spreading misinformation and fake news while at the same time attacking critics of the Duterte administration and several media outlets in the form of "red-tagging".

See also 
 Kingdom Of Jesus Christ The Name Above Every Name
 Kingdom Radio
 KJC King Dome
 Pastor Apollo C. Quiboloy
 Pinas The Filipino's Global Newspaper
 SMNI News Channel
 Sonshine Sports Management
 Sonshine Radio
 Newsmax
 Rebel News
 Light TV
 UNTV
 Net 25
 INC TV
 Hope Channel Philippines
 TV Maria
 Life TV Asia
 GB News 
 One America News Network

References

External links
 

 
Mass media companies of the Philippines
Television networks in the Philippines
Mass media companies established in 2000
Television channels and stations established in 2003
Radio stations in the Philippines
Television in Davao City
Companies based in Davao City
Television in Metro Manila
Companies based in Makati
1987 establishments in the Philippines
Privately held companies of the Philippines
Religious television stations in the Philippines